Presidential elections were held in Cyprus on 13 February 1983. The result was a victory for Spyros Kyprianou of the Democratic Party (and also supported by AKEL), who received 56.5% of the vote. Voter turnout was 95.0%.

Results

References

1983 in Cyprus
Cyprus
Presidential elections in Cyprus
February 1983 events in Europe